Canadian Tire Services Ltd. (CTSL), doing business as Canadian Tire Bank, is the financial services subsidiary of the Canadian Tire retail chain. The bank is based in Oakville, Ontario, and has additional business operations in St. Catharines and Welland (which are also in Ontario). Between 1968 and 2016 (with some branding continuing until 2018), Canadian Tire Services Ltd. was known as Canadian Tire Financial Services Ltd. (CTFS or CTFSL).

History
In 1968, Canadian Tire purchased Midland Shoppers Credit Limited, a small company founded in 1961 to provide third-party credit processing for local retailers in the Niagara Region. After its acquisition, the company was renamed "Canadian Tire Acceptance Limited (CTAL)", and later "Canadian Tire Financial Services Limited".

Canadian Tire Bank (CTB), a Schedule 1 (domestic, deposit-taking) bank under the Bank Act, was founded in 2003 and took over financial services that had been provided by CTFS. In addition to MasterCard credit card services, Canadian Tire Bank also launched high interest savings accounts, tax-free savings accounts, and GIC products.

In 2014, Scotiabank signed a deal to buy a 20 percent stake in Canadian Tire's financial services business, which includes Canadian Tire Bank, for $500 million in cash as part of a strategic partnership between the two companies under which Scotiabank was also permitted to buy up to an additional 30% (or sell back to Canadian Tire its 20% stake) at the then fair market value within 10 years.

MasterCard 
In 1995, the bank issued the Canadian Tire Options MasterCard nationally with a reward program for purchases of products from Canadian Tire and, later, launched its Gas Advantage MasterCard product whereby the cardholder earned a tiered discount of 2–10¢ (in Canadian currency) per litre on gasoline purchases from Canadian Tire based on the previous month's gas purchases. In 2008, it embedded the card with Mastercard's PayPass "tap-and-go" technology. These cards continue to be offered by Canadian Tire Bank.

In 2006, the bank began a pilot program of the Cash Advantage MasterCard. Its reward program allowed cardholders to earn up to 1.5% cash back based on the amount of eligible annual purchases made on their card. In 2007, it created the Vacation Advantage MasterCard, with cardholders rewarded with points that could be redeemed for any vacation-related purchase.

In 2009, it issued the Curve MasterCard nationwide, so named for the distinctly curved shape of the lower right-hand corner of the card. It had no annual fee and had a reward program that allowed cardholders to earn up to 3.5% cash back, based on the amount of eligible annual purchases made on their card. Cardholders could earn double cash back at Canadian Tire and Mark's Work Wearhouse stores. (Mark's is a clothing and footwear retailer that has been a subsidiary of Canadian Tire since 2002.) In late 2010, the Vacation Advantage and Curve MasterCards were removed from Canadian Tire's credit portfolio.

On May 1, 2018, the cards were rebranded under the Triangle Rewards name, to match up with Canadian Tire's new customer loyalty program.

On March 11, 2022, Canadian Tire announced that Triangle Mastercard holders would earn 10¢ by using their card on fuel purchases at any gas station across the nation. This period ended June 19, 2022 and the Canadian Tire Triangle Mastercard now earns 5¢ on fuel purchases.

Insurance
CTB markets payment protection insurance underwritten by Assurant, and identity theft insurance offered in a partnership arrangement with Sigma Loyalty Group who, in turn, partners with Intersections, Inc., to underwrite the policies under its Identity Guard product offering. It used to sell term life and travel insurance underwritten by Canada Life, but later stopped marketing those products.

Retail banking
In October 2006, CTB began to offer more traditional banking services over the phone or online. Such offerings included, as of 2019:
Savings accounts
Tax-free savings accounts
Guaranteed investment certificates

The bank used to offer mortgages, but in October 2009, CTB sold its residential real estate secured lending portfolio of approximately 1,000 mortgages valued at approximately $167 million to National Bank of Canada and no longer offers mortgage products.

All deposit products are automatically insured to applicable limits by the federal crown corporation Canada Deposit Insurance Corporation (CDIC).

References

External links

 

Bank
Scotiabank
2003 establishments in Ontario
Canadian companies established in 2003
Banks established in 2003
Banks of Canada
Companies based in Oakville, Ontario
Supermarket banks
Online banks
Financial services brands
Financial services companies of Canada
Companies based in Ontario
Online financial services companies of Canada